
Gmina Bakałarzewo is a rural gmina (administrative district) in Suwałki County, Podlaskie Voivodeship, in north-eastern Poland.

Villages
Gmina Bakałarzewo contains the villages and settlements of Aleksandrowo, Bakałarzewo, Gębalówka, Góra, Kamionka Poprzeczna, Karasiewo, Klonowa Góra, Konopki, Kotowina, Malinówka, Maryna, Matłak, Nieszki, Nowa Kamionka, Nowa Wieś, Nowy Dwór, Nowy Skazdub, Orłowo, Płociczno, Podgórze, Podrabalina, Podwólczanka, Sadłowina, Słupie, Sokołowo, Stara Chmielówka, Stara Kamionka, Stary Skazdub, Suchorzec, Wólka, Wólka-Folwark, Zajączkowo, Zajączkowo-Folwark and Zdręby.

Neighbouring gminas
Gmina Bakałarzewo is bordered by the gminas of Filipów, Olecko, Raczki, Suwałki and Wieliczki.

Sister cities 
  Attert (Belgium) since 2005

References

 Polish official population figures 2006

Bakalarzewo
Suwałki County